Sylvain Moukwelle (born 13 January 1978 in Douala, Cameroon) is a Cameroonian-French retired footballer.

Playing career

Switzerland
Moukwelle played for FC Sion and FC Lugano in the Swiss top flight.

Indonesia
On the verge of leaving Persewangi Banyuwangi by Autumn 2012, Moukwelle was claimed he was supposed to have been paid 237 million Indonesian rupiahs midway though October, but was hospitalized for typhoid  and became even more crestfallen as he could not celebrate Christmas with his family. To make matters worse, the Kadji Sports Academy graduate's mother was treated for breast cancer and he was only given 50 million rupiahs close to February 2013, receiving enough money to purchase a ticket to France by supporter Ahmad Mustain a month later.

Cameroon
Moukwelle made two appearances for Cameroon.

References

External links 
 at National-Football-Teams

Living people
1978 births
Persiba Bantul players
FC Lugano players
FC Sion players
Persewangi Banyuwangi players
Persis Solo players
Deltras F.C. players
French expatriate footballers
Expatriate footballers in Switzerland
Association football defenders
Cameroonian expatriate footballers
Cameroonian footballers
FC Rouen players
AC Bellinzona players
CMS Oissel players
FC Aurillac Arpajon Cantal Auvergne players
French footballers
Expatriate footballers in Indonesia
Expatriate footballers in France
Cameroon international footballers
Association football midfielders